Eloxochitlán may refer to several places in Mexico:

Eloxochitlán, Hidalgo
Eloxochitlán, Puebla
Eloxochitlán, Oaxaca ("Eloxochitlán de Flores Magón")